Hesar-e Sopurghan (also Romanized as Ḩeşār-e Sopūrghān; also known as Ḩeşār-e Soporghān) is a village in Tala Tappeh Rural District, Nazlu District, Urmia County, West Azerbaijan Province, Iran. At the 2006 census, its population was 141, in 45 families.

References 

Populated places in Urmia County